Jacob ben Abraham Faitusi (died July 1812 in Algiers) was a Tunisian Jewish scholar. He settled in the later part of his life at Jerusalem, whence he was sent as a collector of alms to Italy and Algeria.

Faitusi was the author of Berit Ya'aqob (Livorno, 1800), the contents of which were as follows: sermons; Bezalel Ashkenazi's "Shittah Mequbbetzet" on Sotah, with the editor's notes, entitled "Yagel Ya'aqob"; glosses of the Geonim on the Talmudical treatises Nedarim and Nazir, with the editor's notes; commentaries on Nazir by Abraham ben Musa; "Sha'are Tzedeq," a commentary, attributed to Levi ben Gershon, on the thirteen hermeneutic rules of Rabbi Ishmael; novellæ on Chullin and Pesachim; and poems, entitled "Qontres Acharon."

Faitusi wrote also Yerek Ya'aqob (Livorno, 1842), sermons arranged in the order of the Sabbatical sections, with an appendix entitled "Ya'ir Kokab mi-Ya'aqob," containing novellæ and responsa. He also edited Mizbach Kapparah of Nachmanides; Bezalel Ashkenazi's Shittah Mequbbetzet on Zebachim and various tosafot of Rabbi Perez, Eliezer of Touques, and others on several Talmudical treatises, with an appendix entitled "Ranenu le-Ya'aqob" (Livorno, 1810) containing Talmudic novellæ and sermons by Jacob (republished with additions by Saul ha-Levi, Lemberg, 1861); "Sefer Mar'eh ha-Ofannim" (Livorno, 1810), containing Asher ben Jehiel's novellæ on Sotah, Aaron ha-Levi's "Shittah" on Betzah, and an appendix entitled "Yagel Ya'aqob," containing novellæ on Pesachim, Betzah, Rosh Hashanah, Mo'ed Katan, Avodah Zarah, and Makkot.

Bibliography
Nepi, Graziadio and Ghirondi, Mordecai, Toledot Gedole Yisrael, p. 211
Steinschneider, Moritz, Catalogus Librorum Hebræorum in Bibliotheca Bodleiana col. 1210
Zedner, Joseph, Catalogue of the Hebrew Books in the British Museum, p. 247
Cazès, David, Notes Bibliographiques sur la Littérature Juive Tunisienne, pp. 182 et seq.

1812 deaths
Year of birth missing
18th-century Tunisian Jews
Talmudists
19th-century scholars
18th-century scholars
19th-century Jews
Tunisian theologians